During the COVID-19 pandemic in Croatia, vaccination against COVID-19 began on 27 December 2020. The Croatian government ordered vaccines together with the EU. 8.7 million doses have been ordered. As of 3 February 2022, over 2.2 million people were fully vaccinated, corresponding to a 63% vaccination rate of the country's population.

References 

COVID-19 pandemic in Croatia
COVID-19 vaccination by country
2021 in Croatia
2020 in Croatia